"Chica de Ayer" (Eng.: Yesterday Girl) is a pop song written by Antonio Vega and recorded by Spanish rock band Nacha Pop in 1980, which was included on their album Nacha Pop.

Popular culture
The title of the song was used as the name of the Spanish television series La Chica de Ayer which was based on the British detective show Life on Mars, which was similarly named after a David Bowie song. The same title is also used as the name of a contemporary poetry book, written by Solange De-Ré (Imaginante Editorial).

Enrique Iglesias version

Spanish singer-songwriter Enrique Iglesias recorded a version of "La Chica de Ayer" for his album Quizás in 2002. The song was released as promotional single.

References

External links
 
 

1980 songs
2002 singles
Enrique Iglesias songs
Spanish songs
Number-one singles in Spain
Songs written by Antonio Vega (singer)
Song recordings produced by Lester Mendez